Romina Ottoboni (born 19 June 1978) is an Argentine former professional tennis player.

Ottoboni reached a best singles ranking of 286 and won five ITF Circuit titles. As a doubles player she was more successful, with 14 titles on the ITF Circuit and a highest ranking of 157 in the world.

On the WTA Tour, Ottoboni was a three-time doubles quarterfinalist and made her only singles main-draw appearance at the Copa Colsanitas in Bogotá, as a qualifier. She defeated the second seed in qualifying, Jelena Dokic, before being eliminated in the first round of the main draw by Gisela Riera.

Ottoboni most recently played in a professional match in March 2003, losing in the first round of an ITF doubles tournament in Rabat, Morocco. She played her final singles match a year prior, in April 2002, in Belo Horizonte, Brazil where she lost in the first round of the main draw as a qualifier.

ITF Circuit finals

Singles: 7 (5 titles, 2 runner-ups)

Doubles: 17 (14 titles, 3 runner-ups)

References

External links
 
 

1978 births
Living people
Argentine female tennis players
20th-century Argentine women
21st-century Argentine women